Minuscule 663 (in the Gregory-Aland numbering), ε 387 (von Soden), is a Greek minuscule manuscript of the New Testament, on parchment. Palaeographically it has been assigned to the 13th century. The manuscript is lacunose.

Description 

The codex contains the text of the four Gospels, on 277 parchment leaves (size ), with only one lacuna (Matthew 26:27-39). The text is written in one column per page, 18 lines per page, in very small letters.

Text 

The Greek text of the codex is a representative of the Byzantine text-type. Hermann von Soden classified to the textual family Kx. Kurt Aland placed it in Category V.

According to the Wisse's Profile Method it belongs to the textual cluster Cl 121.

Textually it is close to the Complutensian Polyglot.

History 

Gregory dated the manuscript to the 13th century. Currently the manuscript is dated by the INTF to the 13th century.

The manuscript was presented by Nicephorus Glykas, Bishop of Imbro, to Eduard Reuss.

The manuscript was added to the list of New Testament manuscripts by Scrivener. Gregory saw it in 1887.

Currently the manuscript is housed at the Bibliothèque nationale et universitaire (Ms. 1907), in Strasbourg.

See also 

 List of New Testament minuscules
 Biblical manuscript
 Textual criticism

References

Further reading 
 Eduard Reuss, Notitia codicis qvattvor evangeliorvm graeci membranacei viris doctis hvcvsqve incogniti qvem in mvseo, Cambridge 1889.

Greek New Testament minuscules
11th-century biblical manuscripts